Laurent Genefort (born 1968) is a French science fiction writer.

He has written about 50 novels and won the Grand Prix de l'Imaginaire in 1995 for Arago.

Fiction
 Le Bagne des ténèbres (1988)
 Les Peaux-épaisses (1992)
 REZO (1993)
 Arago (1993)
 Les chasseurs de sève (1994) 
 La Troisième lune (1994)
 Le Labyrinthe de chair (1995)
 De chair et de fer (1995)
 L'Homme qui n'existait plus (1996) - Jean-Michel Ponzio made this story into a graphic novel under the title Kybrilon in March 2005
 Les Voies du ciel (1996)
 La Compagnie des fous (1996)
 Lyane (1996)
 Le Sang des immortels (1997)
 Le Continent déchiqueté (1997)
 Typhon (1997)
 Dans la gueule du Dragon (1998)
 Les Croisés du vide (1998)
 Le Château cannibale (1998)
 Les Engloutis (1999)
 Le Sablier de Sang (1999)
 Une porte sur l'éther (2000) 
 La Citadelle des dragons (2000)
 Le Démon-miroir (2001)
 Omale (2001) 
 Le Labyrinthe sans retour (2001)
 La Frontière magique (2001)
 Les conquérants dOmale (2002)
 Le Piège aux sorciers (2002)
 La mécanique du talion (2003)  
 Le Sablier maléfique (2003)
 La Caravane des ombres (2003)
 La muraille sainte d'Omale (2004)
 L'Odyssée des sirènes (2004)
 Le Nom maudit (2005)
 La Guerre de l'aube (2006)
 L'Ascension du Serpent (2007)
 Le Vol de l'Aigle (2008)
 Mémoria (2008)
 Divergences 001(2008) 
 Les Crocs du Tigre (2010)
 Points chauds (2012)
 Les Vaisseaux d’Omale (2014)
 Lum'en (2015)
 Etoiles sans issue (2017)
 Ce qui relie (2017)
 Ce qui divise (2017)
 Ce qui révèle (2018)
 Colonies (2019)
 L'Espace entre les guerres (2020)

Non-Fiction
 Architecture du livre-univers dans la science-fiction, à travers cinq œuvres : Noô de S. Wul, Dune de F. Herbert, La Compagnie des glaces de G.-J. Arnaud, Helliconia de B. Aldiss, Hypérion de D. Simmons (1997) - Thesis. Université de Nice Sophia-Antipolis.
Plus more than 30 articles and prefaces about science fiction.

References

French science fiction writers
Living people
1968 births
French male novelists